An opposition primary was held in Hungary, between 18–28 September 2021 (first round) and 10–16 October 2021 (second round), to select the candidate for Prime Minister of Hungary supported by the opposition parties to form a coalition to compete in the 2022 parliamentary election. It was the first countrywide primary election in the political history of Hungary. The parties had also selected common candidates for single-member districts via the primary.

Non-partisan candidate Péter Márki-Zay was elected as prime ministerial candidate of the United Opposition.

Background
The agreement to hold the primary for the prime minister candidate was reached on 15 November 2020 between the Democratic Coalition, Jobbik, LMP – Hungary's Green Party, Momentum Movement, Hungarian Socialist Party, and Dialogue for Hungary. These parties were supported by most opposition voters in the 2018 Hungarian parliamentary election, having received 46.47% of the party list vote. On 20 December 2020, they also agreed on presenting a single party list for the election. A document about the foundations of the common election manifesto was signed by the party leaders on 5 January 2021.

Electoral process 

Primaries were to be held for both the prime ministerial candidate and the candidates for the National Assembly in all 106 districts. A prime ministerial candidate had to provide 20,000 signatures in support by 6 September, while a constituency candidate had to provide 400. Independents and candidates of affiliated parties (New World People's Party, Hungarian Liberal Party and New Start) could participate, but they had to sign an agreement with one of the six organizing parties that they would join their parliamentary group if elected.

Constituency candidates were to be selected in a single round of first-past-the-post voting, while the prime ministerial candidate was to be chosen in the second round of voting, to which at most three candidates could qualify. The first round of voting was to be held between 18 and 26 September, and the second between 10 and 16 October, with voting both online and in-person. Any eligible voter, and underage voters who would be 18 years old by the date of the parliamentary election, could vote in the primaries.

Prime minister candidates

Candidates (second round)

Withdrawn and eliminated candidates

Opinion polls

Graphical summary

First round polling 

{|class="wikitable sortable" style="text-align:center;font-size:95%;line-height:16px;"
|- style="height:42px; background-color:#E9E9E9"
! style="width:120px;" rowspan="2"|Fieldwork date
! style="width:120px;" rowspan="2"|Polling firm
! style="width:60px;" rowspan="2"|Samplesize
! style="width:60px;" class="unsortable"| Klára Dobrev
!- style="width:60px;" class="unsortable"| András Fekete-Győr
! style="width:60px;" class="unsortable"| Péter Jakab
! style="width:60px;" class="unsortable"| Gergely Karácsony
! style="width:60px;" class="unsortable"| Péter Márki-Zay
! style="width:40px;" class="unsortable" rowspan="2"| Others
! style="width:40px;" class="unsortable" rowspan="2"| No answer
|-
! style="background:"|
! style="background:"|
! style="background:"|
! style="background:"|
! style="background:#001166"|
|-
|September 2021
|Publicus
|1198
|28
|4
|12
|style="background:#d3f0d4" |31
|23
| 2
| -
|-
|September 2021
|Publicus
|612
|30
|2
|11
|style="background:#d3f0d4" |31
|11
| 15
| -
|-
|September 2021
|PegaPoll
|19.500
|style="background:#dce8fc" |31
|3
|style="background:#bee9e8"|31
|21
|12
| -
| -
|-
|August 2021
|Publicus
|1009
|29
|3
|23
|style="background:#d3f0d4" | 34
|4
| -
| -
|-
|August 2021
|Civitas
|1001
|style="background:#dce8fc" | 32
|5
|23
|16
|11
|11
| -
|-
|July 2021
|Pulzus
|1000
|style="background:#dce8fc" | 19
|3
|14
|style="background:#d3f0d4" | 19
|9
| -
| -
|-
|July 2021
|Závecz Research
|1200
|27
|12
| style="background:#bee9e8" |28
|24
|5
| -
| -
|-
|June 2021
|KutatóCentrum
|1000
|17
|3
| style="background:#bee9e8" |47|20
|11
| -
| -
|-
| data-sort-value="2021-06-01" |June 2021
|Medián
|1000
|26
|8
| style="background:#bee9e8" |43|41
|16
|5
| -
|-
|-
|data-sort-value="2021-05-01"|May 2021
|Publicus
|1011
|32
|2
|15
|style="background:#d3f0d4"|34|9
| -
| 8
|-
|data-sort-value="2021-05-01"|May 2021
|Civitas
|1003
|25
|6
|style="background:#bee9e8"|30|20
|7
|1
| -
|-
|data-sort-value="2021-04-01"|Apr 2021
|Publicus
|1012
|25
|2
|19
| style="background:#d3f0d4" |31|13
| -
| -
|-
|data-sort-value="2021-04-01"|Apr 2021
|Medián
|1000
|22
|14
|style="background:#bee9e8"|40|34
|23
| -
| -
|-
|data-sort-value="2021-04-01"|Apr 2021
|Nézőpont
|1000
|10
|6
|style="background:#bee9e8" | 21|20
|12
|22
| -
|-
|data-sort-value="2021-03-01"|Mar 2021
|Civitas
|1007
|17
|12
|style="background:#bee9e8" | 31|26
|12
|2
| -
|-
|data-sort-value="2021-03-01"|Mar 2021
|Závecz Research
|1000
|33
|19
|style="background:#bee9e8" | 35|19
|6
| -
| -
|-
|data-sort-value="2021-02-01"|Feb 2021
|IDEA
|2000
|style="background:#dce8fc" | 30|8
|29
|24
|9
| -
| -
|-
|data-sort-value="2021-02-01"|Feb 2021
|Medián
|1000
|25
|10
|32
| style="background:#d3f0d4" |39|22
| -
| -
|-
|data-sort-value="2021-01-01"|Jan 2021
|Pulzus
|1000
| style="background:#dce8fc" |19|11
|16
| style="background:#d3f0d4" |19|15
|8
| -
|-
|data-sort-value="2020-12-01"|Dec 2020
|Századvég
|1000
| style="background:#dce8fc" | 32'| 7
| 17
| 20
| 24
| -
| -
|}

 Second round polling 

 Debates 

 Endorsements 

 Constituencies 

265 candidates have officially registered until the 15 August deadline to run in one of the 106 constituencies. In 11 districts, only one candidate has registered, while the highest number of competitors was 5, which happened in three places. 258 of them has managed to submit the required 400 signatures until 6 September.

 Breakdown of candidates by selected parliamentary group 

 Party list 

On 20 December 2020, all six parties agreed on presenting a single party list for the election. The primary election does not directly affect the composition of this list.

 Results 

 First round 

 Prime Minister candidates 

 Constituencies 

 Events between the two rounds 
On 1 October 2021, it became clear that Klára Dobrev and her party, the Democratic Coalition (DK) won the first round with a convincing advantage, obtaining 34.84% and 32 constituencies, respectively. Out of 106, Dobrev took first place in the competition for prime ministerial candidates in 85 constituencies; she won by a huge margin in the countryside, while the results in Budapest proved to be more balanced. Despite his initial favoured position for the candidacy, Gergely Karácsony came to the second place (27.3%), and, beside few places in countryside, he could practically only win in the majority of constituencies of Budapest, where he is serving as mayor (altogether 15 constituencies). As a general surprise in mainstream politics and media, independent candidate without any party affiliation Péter Márki-Zay acquired the third place (20.4%), qualifying the second round, while Péter Jakab (Jobbik) – who though was featured as a front-runner in opinion polls – and András Fekete-Győr (Momentum) were eliminated.

Already after the publication of the preliminary results in the eve of 29 September, Péter Márki-Zay initiated negotiations with Gergely Karácsony on the possible withdrawal of one of them in favor of the other, arguing that Klára Dobrev – as the wife of former prime minister Ferenc Gyurcsány, the most divisive politician in Hungary – is the least capable of defeating Viktor Orbán as the prime ministerial candidate of the opposition coalition in the 2022 parliamentary election. Márki-Zay, in return for his withdrawal, imposed three conditions: accountability of the Fidesz government and its corruption cases, adoption of euro and repeal of the fundamental law. On the same day, Karácsony himself refused to step back in an interview at Partizán'' online channel,  and offered that Márki-Zay could also be the deputy prime minister in his government after a potential victory in 2022. He believed his voters largely would not support Márki-Zay if he withdrew from the primary. Karácsony also argued that under Dobrev's leadership, the opposition cannot replace the current government. In contrast, Márki-Zay emphasized that the majority of Jobbik and Momentum voters, whose candidates were eliminated in the first round, will support his candidacy in the second round. He also argued he spent orders of magnitude less money during the campaign than Karácsony, yet he achieved "almost the same result" in the first round.

DK politicians, including Ferenc Gyurcsány strongly criticized the tactical talks between the two politicians, arguing that it is up to the electorate to decide which of the three candidates is the most capable prime ministerial candidate able to defeat Orbán in 2022. Klára Dobrev emphasized she does not deal with the struggle of her two competitors. She said "the change of government will depend on whether we will be able to shake up the whole country, as it is not possible to change government only from Budapest. I am working on this right now". Jobbik leader and eliminated candidate Péter Jakab also opposed the cooperation negotiations between Karácsony and Márki-Zay. He said he could support it if two candidates came together to increase the number of opposition voters. "But if the two of you get together so that the third doesn't win, all they do is do wounds", he added.

Karácsony and Márki-Zay jointly announced on 1 October that they will continue the campaign together, one as prime minister and the other as deputy prime minister, but it will be later decided which of them will step back in favor of the other. They both thought they were better suited for the ultimate victory and trusted that they would succeed in convincing the other of this. On 3 October, Karácsony held a campaign event, where he stated "I can replace Viktor Orbán. Therefore, I do not step back, but forward" and called himself as a "common ground" within the opposition alliance. During an interview with Telex.hu in the same event, he also said he would step back at most if he was "hit by a tram". On the same day, Márki-Zay also organized a street rally, where he said that he believes he is the one who could address most people, but if Karácsony makes a vanity question out of the candidacy, he won't be involved in this "chicken game" and "he will pull the steering wheel aside". On the next day (4 October), Karácsonyi visited Márki-Zay at Hódmezővásárhely, where they confirmed their intention to run in the second round together and requested the National Primary Election Office (OEVB) for their names to appear next to each other and not below each other on the ballot paper. They added that they would establish a joint programme and would provide the mutual guarantee by maintaining the right of consent between the two actors (prime minister and deputy prime minister), i.e. deciding jointly on everything after formation of the government in 2022. The OEVB, however, did not allow their names to appear next to each other. György Magyar, the chairman of the Civil Election Commission stated that the appearance of a two-member candidate in the ballot paper would be surreal and the accepted election rules cannot be changed retrospectively. Klára Dobrev told that she felt the idea is a "confusing proposition". Márki-Zay blamed the "DK–Jobbik coalition" which did not allow to do that. He added "Dobrev's success is unquestionable, but the catastrophic results before 2010, which gave Fidesz two-thirds at the time, and the many billions the ruling party spent on negative campaigning against Gyurcsány, make Klára Dobrev the least potential candidate against Viktor Orbán".

On 5–7 October, several polls have been published that have yielded different results. According to a survey by Publicus and Republikon, Karácsony, according to Závecz and Medián, Márki-Zay had a better chance of winning over Klára Dobrev in the second round. Thereafter, Márki-Zay stated "the numbers say very clearly that I am not the one who has to step back". Within few hours, Karácsony announced an extraordinary press conference in which he reiterated that he would not withdraw his nomination. He announced he will represent the program of its own and the parties supporting it, because he is convinced that this program guarantees only the "social reconciliation for Hungary". Márki-Zay responded that "the tram has arrived" and at present, Karácsony has no chance of defeating Klára Dobrev in the primary and thus defeating Viktor Orbán in 2022. Negotiations between them did not reach result in that afternoon, and Karácsony announced neither will step back in favor of the other, three candidates will be on the ballot.

On 7 October, András Fekete-Győr announced that his party, the Momentum Movement will support Márki-Zay in the second round. The party's vice-chairperson Anna Orosz argued they must support not only the most honest candidate, but also one who can address voters from the left, the right and the insecure voters. On 8 October, Márki-Zay and Karácsony summoned a joint press conference at the Kossuth Square. There, Karácsony announced the withdrawal of his candidacy in favor of Márki-Zay. He said "I came to the insight yesterday that if I do not do this, Viktor Orbán will remain in power". Márki-Zay responded that "Gergely Karácsony proved that the interest of the homeland is most important to him" and called him a "statesman".

Despite Karácsony's decision, the parties supporting him – MSZP, Dialogue and LMP – did not express their support for Márki-Zay and Jobbik also remained neutral. All three parties said they would support the winner – either Dobrev or Márki-Zay – in the 2022 election. A minor political party, New Start declared its support for Márki-Zay. The minor Social Democratic Party of Hungary endorsed Márki-Zay. Abandoning its former neutral position, the presidium of MSZP called for support of Márki-Zay on 14 October, two days before the end of the second round, despite the fact that many prominent members had previously endorsed Klára Dobrev.

Second round 

219,991 electors, who voted in the second round, previously did not go to the polls in the first round. Consequently, altogether 853,802 electors had participated in the opposition primary (either in one or the other, or both rounds). 442,025 voters participated in both rounds, while 191,786 people voted only in the first round.

Notes

References 

September 2021 events in Hungary
October 2021 events in Hungary
Opposition to Viktor Orbán
Primary elections in Hungary
2021 political party leadership elections
2021 elections in Hungary